Kufa is a city in Iraq.

Kufa may also refer to:
 Kufa, Republic of Dagestan, a rural locality in Dagestan, Russia
 Kufa University, Iraqi governmental university
 Great Mosque of Kufa, one of the earliest mosques in Islam, located in Kufa, Iraq
 Kufa FC, an Iraqi football team based in Kufa, Iraq
 Kufa District, a district of the Najaf Governorate, Iraq
 Kuphar, a Babylonian or Iraqi coracle
 KUFA (FM), a radio station (104.3 FM) licensed to serve Hebronville, Texas, United States
KüfA ("Kuchen für Alle"), a Volxkuche or leftist Soup kitchen in Germany or The Netherlands.

See also 
 Kufah (disambiguation)
 Kufra